Lefa Tsutsulupa (born 7 February 1980) is a South African former professional soccer player who played as a midfielder. He played internationally for South Africa.

Career
Born in Ladybrand, Lefa began playing professional football with Bloemfontein Celtic at age 19. After the club was relegated to the First Division, he played for another two seasons before a brief spell with Jomo Cosmos before reviving his career with Moroka Swallows. He made over 300 appearances in the Premier Soccer League, most of them with Moroka Swallows. He captained for club for five seasons and won the 2008–09 Nedbank Cup during his time with Swallows.

References

External links

1980 births
Living people
People from Ladybrand
South African Sotho people
South African soccer players
Jomo Cosmos F.C. players
Bloemfontein Celtic F.C. players
Moroka Swallows F.C. players
Association football midfielders
South Africa international soccer players